Ishigeales is an order of brown algae. It includes two families, Ishigeaceae and Petrodermataceae. The genus Diplura is also included, but not placed to family.

References

Brown algae
Brown algae orders